The Darebin International Sports Centre (DISC) is an athletic facility in Thornbury, Victoria, Australia.  DISC is the home of the State Lawn Bowls Centre, the State Cycling Centre and the State Football Centre.

DISSC has four International Standard Lawn Bowl Greens and an indoor synthetic green.  DISC hosted the 2006 Commonwealth Games for Lawn Bowls. 

DISC has three football pitches with synthetic turf surfaces.  The pitches are used by club football teams, the National Training Camp and State Football teams.

References 

https://web.archive.org/web/20090912204308/http://www.darebininternationalsportscentre.com.au/index.asp?h=-1
http://www.footballfedvic.com.au

Sports venues in Melbourne
Buildings and structures in the City of Darebin
Sports venues completed in 2005
Cycling in Victoria (Australia)
Bowls in Australia
2005 establishments in Australia
2006 Commonwealth Games venues
Soccer in Melbourne
Lawn bowls at the 2006 Commonwealth Games